Riamilovir (TZV, Triazavirin) is a broad-spectrum antiviral drug developed in Russia through a joint effort of Ural Federal University, Russian Academy of Sciences, Ural Center for Biopharma Technologies and Medsintez Pharmaceutical. It has a novel triazolotriazine core, which represents a new structural class of non-nucleoside antiviral drugs.

The main principle action of triazavirin is to inhibit the synthesis of viral ribonucleic acid (RNA) and the replication of viral genomic fragments through its synthetic analogue to the bases of purine nucleosides.

Uses
It was originally developed as a potential treatment for pandemic influenza strains such as H5N1, and most of the testing that has been done has focused on its anti-influenza activity. However, triazavirin has also been found to have antiviral activity against a number of other viruses including tick-borne encephalitis virus, and is also being investigated for potential application against a lethal influenza infection and secondary bacterial pneumonia following influenza, Lassa fever and Ebola virus disease. Triazavirin has passed clinical trials and has shown antiviral activity against ARVI. In 2020, testing of triazavirin was started against SARS-CoV-2 in Russia, China, and South Africa. 

In August 2014, the Ministry of Health of Russia issued a registration certificate for triazavirin. The active substance of the drug triazavirin is a new active molecule, and can be dispensed by prescription. The production of triazavirin is carried out at a modern pharmaceutical enterprise LLC "Plant Medsintez". The registration procedure for triazavirin has begun in the Republic of South Africa.

Criticism

The studies of Triazavirin were non-blinded and non-randomized, and included 66 patients only with, with 44 in a control group.

See also 
 BCX4430
 Brincidofovir
 Favipiravir
 Umifenovir

References 

Antiviral drugs
Experimental drugs
Lactams
Thioethers
Nitrogen heterocycles
Heterocyclic compounds with 2 rings
Russian drugs
Russian inventions
Triazoles